HY  is a Japanese rock band formed in 2000 by five high school friends from Okinawa. Their name comes from the initials of their hometown, Higashi Yakena. The band's popularity rose rapidly after a series of street performances; their debut album, Departure, released on 22 September 2001 (Okinawa-only), sold out immediately. In 2003, the band conducted a joint live performance with Linkin Park.

Their second album, Street Story, released on 16 April 2003 topped the Oricon charts, staying at number 1 for four straight weeks (Indies Artist Record). Their third album, Trunk, was released on 12 April 2004, and yet again debuted at number 1 — the first time such a feat has been accomplished by an indies artist.

The band's fourth album, Confidence released on 12 April 2006, created yet another indies music record by debuting at number 1 and retaining the top spot for two consecutive weeks. HY has sold out all of their solo concerts. Their 2006 tour was a 47-location nationwide tour which sold out the day that the tickets became available. The tour gathered over 88,000 people. In December 2006, HY's Kumakara Amae ("from the present to the future") concert held in Nippon Budokan and Osaka-jo Hall sold out immediately and gathered over 20,000 fans in two days. HY entered the international music scene, starting with their first-ever overseas tour, beginning in Toronto, Ontario, Canada, and extending to seven major US cities as part of the Japan Nite tour.

Their fifth album, HeartY, was released on 16 April 2008. The album debuted at number 2 and sold over 300,000 units to date.

Overview 
Band name "HY" is a local member "(an East desperation, east Yakena H Igashi- Y Akena)" is taken from the initials of. Higashi Yakena is an area name in the center of Yonashiro, Uruma City, Okinawa Prefecture ( Yonashiro Town, Nakagami District when the band was formed ).

Since its formation in 2000, it has been active in the indie scene to this day. The second album "Street Story" released in 2003 reached No. 1 on the Oricon chart at the same time as it was released, and became No. 1 for 4 consecutive weeks, setting the first record for indies. Since then, it has become so popular that tickets are sold out on the same day, from live houses to arena tours. In 2007, he toured Canada. While based in his hometown of Okinawa, he is expanding his activities overseas.

In addition, it is basically an activity only for album release, and singles are rarely released. All the so-called "representative songs" are recorded in the album and are not single-cut.

For a long time since his debut, he belonged to the independent label "Higashiya Keimei Construction" (the label name is not actually a construction-related company) in TV Asahi Music , but as of April 23, 2013 The management contract with TV Asahi Music has ended. After that , he established a new label " ASSE !! Records " backed up by Universal J and a private office " HY ENTERTAINMENT " in August of the same year  and belongs to it.

History

Encounter-Debuted in 3rd year of high school 
Niisato and Miyazato have been childhood friends since they were in kindergarten. In junior high school, Niisato and Miyazato became close to each other, and after waking up to music, they played the guitar together. Soon after, Mika turned to drums. About that time, he later explained the reason, "It was not fun to play the guitar for all three, so Shun was told to play the drums, and it was fun to try it . " Kyoda and Izumi Nakasone met these three in high school and formed a band in 2000 . At that time, he was active under the band name "Higashi Yakena", which used the local place name as it was.

At the beginning of the formation, he appeared at a live performance in the form of a band held at a live house on Saturdays and Sundays once every two weeks. At that time, he was based in Okinawa City 's live house "Seventh Heaven Koza", and he was dressed strangely to leave an impact (for example, Mika was "naked and wrote an eye-catching father on her body with magic", Niisato "It comes out with a string attached to a dog or some stuffed animal") and was playing. It is said that Miyazato's father carried an instrument and picked him up at the end of the live, partly because all the members were high school students and had no money. 

In 2001 , when he was in his third year of high school, he made and recorded the original song "White Beach" as the last memory of the band. I felt like "everyone is going on a different path with this," but the studio staff asked me, "It's a good song, why don't you play it outside?" After consulting with five people and having trouble, we decided to go on the musical path.  front of the Ferris wheel at Carnival Park Mihama (in Mihama Town Resort American Village ) in Chatan Town , Nakagami District, 20 km away from the local area. Start a street live  . We had about 3 performances a day in the heat of summer. At the beginning of the street activity, no one saw the performance, and even though the members' friends were called as guests, more and more people began to gather by word of mouth as the live performances were repeated, "a state where all 360 degrees are surrounded". It became. Niisato says, "Street live is our starting point," and it has influenced the attitude of the live performance after "I want to get closer to the fans." 

During this time, I lived a life of writing songs and entering the studio without summer vacation or winter vacation. After school, the staff will pick you up by car, and you will drive to Chatan every day. It was difficult to go back and forth because the local area was far away, and he was so busy that he could only remember it. The recording of his debut album was decided by the beat, but he spared time to sleep and recorded until the morning, and when he was sleepy, he was so busy that he hid under the equipment room and the grand piano. Debuted on September 22nd with the album " Departure ". Initially it was sold only in Okinawa, but in a blink of an eye 10,000 copies were sold out. 

Immediately after graduating from high school , on March 23, 2002, to commemorate the release of the album , the first one-man live was held at the Ginowan Seaside Park Outdoor Theater, mobilizing 3,000 people. The members were impressed by the fruits of their efforts so far. In addition, since he had only 7-8 songs at that time, some songs were played twice  .

On April 10th, "Departure" was released nationwide, expanding the scope of activities to all over Japan . It is said that more than 20 record companies visited HY at that time, but he chose to continue his musical activities as an indie musician in order to follow his own path . Although he did not sign a contract with a major label, he belonged to the Tokyo office ( TV Asahi Music )  .

In June, he participated in the " Paris Music Festival ( fr: Fête de la musique )", a music festival officially recognized by the French government , and performed abroad for the first time. From November to December, the first national tour "HY Ocean 02 TOUR" was held.

Busy days 
On April 16, 2003 , the second album " Street Story " was released. In the indies, he recorded the number one on the Oricon chart for four consecutive weeks, and became a million seller since " MESSAGE " ( MONGOL800 ) as an indie album . Also, from April 16th to July 11th, a live house tour "HY ASSE 03 TOUR" with 54 performances will be held in all prefectures  . Also, on October 27th, he acted as the opening act for Linkin Park 's performance in Japan .

However, despite such a feat, the members felt pain rather than joy. About that time, Nakasone said, "All the members were pleased when the first album was ranked 99th, but honestly I was not interested at all when the second album was ranked 1st. I could not understand even if it was said that I became a million seller. "I didn't really feel it." "Now (as of 2020) I can go back to Okinawa once a week at the longest during the tour, but at that time I couldn't go back until the tour was over. I'm always happy to be back at the final Okinawa performance. I was crying. I'm really happy now compared to those days, "Naka said in an interview with Ryukyu Shimpo , " It was hard to return to Okinawa because 54 performances of the national tour were suddenly decided after the second. "  . According to Kyoda, the stress of not being able to return to Okinawa for a long time made it difficult for members to communicate well, and they began to collide with each other in trivial matters . 

In such a situation, the production of the next album was decided immediately after the national tour was over, and within less than a week, he would enter the studio and produce it in a canned state. Although the recording was decided one month later, there was no new song, and the deadline for song writing was decided unlike before, so the members decided to make an album in a very stressful environment. It was. About this time, Nakasone said, "Maybe that was the hardest thing." "It was hard enough to think that it would be the flow of dissolution ...", Nakasone said, "The hardest and the most member. It was a time when I wasn't on good terms . " However, overcoming that situation, the album was completed.

In an interview with Music Natalie , Mika said, "If everyone said,'Yes, it's over,' HY would have definitely ended at that time, but we didn't say that. It was a difficult situation. However, I felt like "Let's make the next one" and "I want to make the next one", "he recalls . 

And the third album " TRUNK " released on July 14, 2004 also won the 1st place on the Oricon chart following the previous work. These records were the first indie records in history. In addition, the first national hall tour "ITTA SOMUN '04 TOUR ~ What should be there ~" was held from September 24th to December 18th, and 50,000 people were mobilized in all 26 performances.

Breakthrough 
In 2005, the lead track "White Beach" of the 1st album "Departure" was adopted as a campaign CM song for Coca-Cola Japan . An application / lottery event "ANSHI COKE NONJOHNBAR RASSAI !! '05 TOUR" will be held in the company's campaign.

In 2006 , from March 17th to July 28th, a tour of all 47 prefectures, "WATTA SHINKER '06 TOUR ~ mu-ruiinchu ~" was held and 82,000 people were mobilized in all 47 performances. Released the 4th album " Confidence " on April 12th during the tour . Also, the first 50,000 limited album will be released. This work also won the first appearance on the Oricon chart, and this set a new record for the first appearance on the Oricon chart for three consecutive indies . In December, the first arena performance "HY 2006 KUMAKARA AMAE TOUR" will be held. A one-man live was held at Nippon Budokan on the 12th and Osaka Castle Hall on the 19th . Then, on Christmas Eve , a street live performance was held at Carnival Park Mihama, an old nest, and 5,000 spectators visited.

In March 2007, a Canada - America tour was also decided. From March 9th to March 20th, he traveled to eight cities: Toronto , Boston , New York , Philadelphia , Austin , Los Angeles , San Francisco , and Seattle . Immediately after that, from April 9th to April 30th, a total of 10 performances of the Japan domestic tour "HY 2007 AMAKUMA A'CHA JAPAN TOUR" were held.

In April 2008 , the fifth album " HeartY " was released. From May 16th to July 16th, a national hall tour "HY PACHINAI x 32 BAMMICASUNDOH TOUR '08" was held, and 65,000 people were mobilized in all 32 performances. Furthermore, the arena tour "HY PACHINAI x 5 MAGGY HAKODE TOUR '08 & Nartyche" will be held from September 23rd to October 13th. A total of 6 performances, 5 performances nationwide + 1 additional performance, mobilized 50,000 people.

In December, the song "366 days" included in "HeartY" was decided as the theme song for the Fuji TV drama / movie " Red Thread ". The song has become a huge hit with a cumulative distribution of over 4.5 million downloads, and has been covered by many musicians, making it a representative song of HY.

Red and white participation and return to Okinawa 
Also this year, he established the natural brand " HeartY " that he produces .

In 2009, to commemorate the 10th anniversary of the formation, a street live was held again at Carnival Park Mihama, and about 20,000 people , the highest number in history, gathered.

In January 2010 , the sixth album " Whistle " was released. It won the first appearance on the Oricon chart for the first time since "Confidence", and set the record for the first appearance in indies to four works. From March 22nd, a live house tour "HY MACHIKANTY SO-TANDOH TOUR 2010-2011" will be held in all prefectures, mobilizing 70,000 people in all 162 performances.

On August 15th, the NHK General TV documentary "We Must Tell-HY Okinawa Sings" Life "" will be broadcast, and at the end of the year, the 61st NHK Red and White Song Battle will be played for the first time (Shirogumi).

Completed a live house tour for about a year with red and white on March 3, 2011 . On December 23, the same year, as one of the " HeartY activities ", HY's first sponsored festival "SKY Fes 2011 ~ We are always connected ~" was held in Uruma City . In addition to HY, local elementary school students, junior high school choirs, high school students' modern Kumi Odori and Eisa groups appeared.

On March 7, 2012 , the 7th album "PARADE" was released. From March 31st, the arena tour "HY TI-CHI TA-CHI MI-CHI PARADE TOUR 2012" in 5 cities nationwide will be held, and 60,000 people will be mobilized in all 7 performances. On December 5th, the 8th album " Route29 " was released. The NHK serial TV novel " Jun to Ai " theme song "Ichiban ni ni ni" and the drama insert song "Let's go together" will be included in the album. At the end of the same year, he participated in the 63rd NHK Kouhaku Uta Gassen for the second time (Shirogumi).

Return home, establish an independent label 
On April 15, 2013, on April 23, 2013, it was announced that the contract with TV Asahi Music, the management company to which it belongs, would be canceled, the official accounts of the official website and SNS site would be closed, and the fan club would be dissolved . On April 25, the new official site "HY ROAD", official Facebook, and official Twitter were newly established.

In August 2013, he established a new label " ASSE !! Records " and returned the recording base from Tokyo to Okinawa. ASSE is an Okinawan dialect that expresses "surprise" and was named with the desire to "always deliver amazing music." At the same time, the official fan club "HY HUB CLUB" and the paid site for smartphones "HY Quiners" were also opened  . From November 5th, 9 performances of the first tour "HY TO-HAI TOUR 2013" after the transfer will be held at 8 locations.

On February 26, 2014 , the 9th album "GLOCAL" was released. Another version "GLOCAL ~ SPECIAL ASIA EDITION ~" will be released on May 28th, and from May 30th, the hall tour "HY HAI-SAI GLOCAL TOUR 2014" will be held at 22 locations and 23 performances for the first time in 8 years. Subsequently, the first overseas one-man live "HY DA GE HOU GLOCAL LIVE 2014 in TAIWAN" was held from August 23, and the second festival "HY SKY FES 2014" sponsored by HY was held on November 29.

On December 3rd, the 10th album "LOVER" was released. Includes " Anatao Omou Kaze", the theme song of the movie " Lingering Spirits " released on November 22, the same year . The song received Gold certification ( single track , Recording Industry Association of Japan )  .

From January 27, 2015 , live house tour "HY Kana-yo Premium TOUR 2015" will be held in 6 cities and 11 performances. The 11th album "LIFE" was released on July 15th . From September 17th, 41 performances of the hall tour "HY SMILE ♡ LIFE TOUR 2015" will be held. On December 24, Izumi Nakasone appeared in " Christmas no Yakusoku "  .

Collaboration and solo activities of members 
2016 July 6 , HY Tasu BIGMAMA in the name BIGMAMA was co-produced with the collaboration album " Synchronicity released". From September 16th, all 4 performances of HY + BIG MAMA's live house tour "Synchronicity Tour 2016" were performed.

On March 1, 2017 , the 12th album "CHANCE" was released. From March 26th, 20 performances of the live house tour "HY Kamer Tour 2017" will be held.

In this year, the solo activities of the main members became active, and on September 25, Nakasone released the solo album "One Minute Love Song" and the book "One Minute Love Song You Are You". Niisato will also perform a solo tour "Hide's Music Story ~ prologue ~" with 11 performances in 8 cities from December 9th to January 27th, 2018  .

2018 August 22 , all the members were involved in the manufacture self cover - best album released "STORY ~ HY BEST ~". The all prefectures tour "HY STORY TOUR Re-Usagamiso Re MensoｰRe saw is that it Yukuimiso ~" than September 22, China - Shanghai , including to hold all 51 performances performances.

In May 2019, it was announced that Miyazato, who had been out of the hospital due to poor physical condition, would take a rest to concentrate on treatment, and the event until June 2 was held with support members . Released the 13th album "RAINBOW" on June 12th . From June 30th, Niisato's second solo tour "Hide's Music Story ~ / ~ Chapter1 Special Night ~" was held  .

Miyazato's withdrawal, 20th anniversary of formation.

2019 September 5 , Miyazato in medical treatment is withdrawal from HY, it is announced that subsequent band is going to work in four system [18] . Messages from HY staff and members are posted on the official website, and the staff announced that "tours and events will be held as scheduled . " [19]

In addition to feelings of gratitude to the fans and members, Miyazato spelled out his intention, "I want to take good care of myself and take my own path slowly." The remaining four spell out the regret of withdrawal, thanks to Miyazato for supporting the band for many years, and support for medical treatment . [19]

The same year on October 17 from the next 2020 February 9 over to, held the anniversary tour "HY 20th Anniversary RAINBOW TOUR 2019-2020" in the country.

In January 2010, HY's sixth album "whistle" was released. The band topped the Oricon chart. and December 2010, they performed at the 61st NHK Kohaku Uta Gassen. In December 2012, HY released their eighth album "Route 29" which contained the theme song of the NHK Asadora Jun to Ai and performed at the 63rd NHK Kohaku Uta Gassen.

In 2020, we celebrated the 20th anniversary of the formation. The New Year's Eve pink Singing ( BS Nippon Television , Nippon Broadcasting System , AbemaTV debut to, etc.).

Members
 : Guitar, vocals (born )
 : Drums, rapping (born )
 : Bass (born )
 : Keyboard, vocals (born )
 : Guitar (born ), Withdrawn due to health concerns on September 5, 2019.

Discography

Albums
 Departure (22 September 2001)
 Street Story (16 April 2003)
 Trunk (12 April 2004)
 Confidence (12 April 2006)
 HeartY (16 April 2008)
 Whistle (27 January 2010)
 ACHI SOUND ～HY LOVE SUMMER～ (11 August 2010)
 Parade (7 March 2012)
 Route 29 (5 December 2012)
 Glocal (26 February 2014)

References

SXSW: Japan Nite US Tour 2007

External links
 HY official site 
 HY on Universal Music

Japanese alternative rock groups
Musical groups established in 2000
Musical quintets
Musical groups from Okinawa Prefecture
Universal Music Japan artists